"Al di là" ("Beyond") is a song written by Italian composer Carlo Donida and lyricist Mogol, and recorded by Betty Curtis. The English lyrics were written by Ervin Drake. The song was the  entry in the Eurovision Song Contest 1961, performed in Italian by Curtis at the Palais des Festivals in Cannes, France, on 18 March 1961, after Curtis had won the Sanremo Music Festival 1961 on 2 February.

Donida is best known in America for writing "Uno dei tanti", or "I (Who Have Nothing)". English lyricist Drake also wrote the lyrics for such songs as "Quando, quando, quando" and "Good Morning Heartache", and both the music and lyrics for "It Was a Very Good Year".

Cover versions 
In the United States, Emilio Pericoli is the artist most associated with the song. He sang "Al di là" in a nightclub, with a small combo, in the popular 1962 film Rome Adventure, starring Troy Donahue and Suzanne Pleshette, and his single that year on Warner Bros. Records reached number six on Billboards pop chart and number three on the easy-listening chart. Pericoli's version ranked #48 on Billboard'''s 1962 Year-End chart. Pericoli's album version of the song is not the same as in the film. It is much slower and recorded with a full orchestra. (In the film, Donahue's character interprets the song's title as meaning "Beyond the Beyond".) In the UK Singles Chart, Pericoli's version peaked only at number 30, but spent 14 weeks in the Record Retailer Top 50, beginning on 30 June 1962.
It was also recorded by Italian-American singer Connie Francis in Italian in 1962 and in a bilingual version later during the same year, with Connie writing the English lyrics instead of using Ervin Drake's.
Willy Alberti released a version in 1962 and on his 1973 album, Van levenslied tot opera.
Al Hirt also appears in Rome Adventure and plays the song in a nightclub scene. He released a version on his 1963 album, Honey in the Horn.
Jerry Vale released a version on his 1963 album, Arrivederci, Roma.  This version was also part of the soundtrack of the 2019 film The Irishman.
The Ray Charles Singers scored a 1964 hit, peaking at #29 on Billboard's Hot 100 chart with their cover of the song.
Al Martino, who would later play the fictional crooner Johnny Fontaine in the 1972 film The Godfather, recorded "Al di là" in Italian on his 1963 The Italian Voices of Al Martino album (Capitol Records).
In 1966 Don Cornell recorded a cover of the song for the album Andiamo - Let's go with Don Cornell, orchestra directed by Joe Guercio (ABC-Paramount - ABCS 537).
Sergio Franchi is another Italian-American singer associated with this popular song. He recorded on his 1968 RCA Victor album, Wine and Song. Franchi also sang the song on the 26 December 1964, broadcast of The Hollywood Palace.
 In 1994 Délcio Tavares recorded a cover for the Brazilian market on the Italianíssimo II album (ACIT, 60062250).
 Patrizio Buanne recorded on his 2015 Decca Records album Viva la Dolce Vita singing in English and Italian.
Other notable recording include Milva (1961), Ace Cannon – Sweet and Tough'' (1966), Jerry Adriani (1996).
Janice Harper, Capitol Records, 1961.

Charts

References 

Eurovision songs of Italy
Eurovision songs of 1961
Connie Francis songs
Emilio Pericoli songs
MGM Records singles
Sanremo Music Festival songs
Songs written by Mogol (lyricist)
Songs written by Carlo Donida
1961 songs
Number-one singles in Mexico